Don Valley is a constituency in South Yorkshire represented in the House of Commons of the UK Parliament since 2019 by Nick Fletcher of the Conservative Party.

Constituency profile
Created in 1918, Don Valley is a former coal mining area which elected only Labour MPs from 1922 to 2019. The seat recorded a strong Brexit vote (69%) in the 2016 referendum.

Boundaries 

1918—1950: The Urban Districts of Mexborough and Tickhill, and the Rural Districts of Doncaster and Thorne.

1950—1983: The Urban Districts of Adwick-le-Street, Bentley with Arksey, and Tickhill, and the Rural District of Doncaster.

1983—1997: The Metropolitan Borough of Doncaster wards of Conisbrough, Edlington and Warmsworth, Mexborough, Richmond, Rossington, South East, and Southern Parks.

1997—2010: The Metropolitan Borough of Doncaster wards of Conisbrough, Edlington and Warmsworth, Hatfield, Rossington, South East, and Southern Parks.

2010–present: The Metropolitan Borough of Doncaster wards of Conisbrough and Denaby, Edlington and Warmsworth, Finningley, Hatfield, Rossington, Thorne, and Torne Valley.

The current constituency consists of the southern Borough of Doncaster, from Hatfield and the Humberhead Peatlands Nature Reserve in the north and northeast, through Branton, Auckley, and Rossington, to the Torne Valley electoral ward which consists of Wadworth, Tickhill, Braithwell, and in the west Conisbrough.

In boundary changes which took effect at the 2010 election, Sprotbrough was moved to Doncaster North, while in the east the town of Thorne was moved from Doncaster North into Don Valley.

Members of Parliament

Elections

Elections in the 2010s

Elections in the 2000s

Elections in the 1990s

Elections in the 1980s

Elections in the 1970s

Elections in the 1960s

Elections in the 1950s

Elections in the 1940s

Elections in the 1930s

Elections in the 1920s

Elections in the 1910s

See also 
 List of parliamentary constituencies in South Yorkshire

Notes

References

Sources
Guardian Unlimited Politics (Election results from 1992 to the present)
Politicsresources.net - Official Web Site ✔  (Election results from 1951 to the present)
F. W. S. Craig, British Parliamentary Election Results 1918 - 1949
F. W. S. Craig, British Parliamentary Election Results 1950 - 1970

Politics of Doncaster
Parliamentary constituencies in Yorkshire and the Humber
Constituencies of the Parliament of the United Kingdom established in 1918